Savage (Songs from a Broken World) is the eighteenth solo studio album by English musician Gary Numan, released on 15 September 2017 by BMG and The End. The album was first announced to be a part of a fan-backed Pledge Music Campaign on 12 November 2015. On 9 November 2018, a followup EP titled The Fallen was released. The EP features similar artwork to Savage, and it was intended to complement the album.

The album reached No. 2 in the UK Top 40 album charts, becoming Numan's sixth Top 10 album, and the first since 1982. It proved to be his highest charting album outside of the number-one albums Replicas, The Pleasure Principle and Telekon from 1979 and 1980 and surpassed 1981's Dance, which reached No. 3. It became his first album since Telekon to chart in multiple countries.

Album concept 
Savage (Songs from a Broken World) is a concept album centered around the blending of Western and Eastern cultures in a post-apocalyptic world that has become desertified as a result of global warming. "The  songs  are  about  the  things  that  people  do  in  such  a  harsh  and  terrifying  environment," Numan stated in an interview. "It's about a desperate need to survive and they do awful things in order to do so, and some are haunted by what they've done. That desire to be forgiven, along with some discovered remnants of an old religious book, ultimately encourages religion to resurface, and it really goes downhill from there."

Recording, working titles, and song notes 
In order of appearance, working demo song titles included:

"Song 1" (became the 3:17 instrumental introduction to "Broken", after initially being retitled for the album as "If You Had Seen")
"Dome" (became "Mercy")
"Kontakt 7" (became "Bed of Thorns")
"Nameless" (became "Pray for the Pain You Serve", after initially being retitled for the album as "I Belong Here")
"March" (became "My Name Is Ruin")
"I Heard a Voice" (became "The End of Things")
"Save Me" (became "What God Intended")
"Where Will You Be (When the World Comes Apart)" (was retitled to "When the World Comes Apart" for the album)

"When the world comes apart" is a line from the 1994 Sacrifice song "Magic", and "Mercy" (appearing on the album proper) was an early demo title during the 2006 Jagged sessions, which would eventually become "We Are the Lost" from Dead Son Rising.

A 'pre-Ade Fenton' mp3 of "Bed of Thorns" was made available to download on 3 September 2016. This demo version also appears on the soundtrack to the 2017 film Ghost in the Shell. To quote Numan: "I have a new song 'Bed of Thorns' on the recently released Ghost in the Shell album. To be exact it's my early demo version of the song. The version that will come out on my Savage album in a few months is considerably different." "Bed of Thorns" debuted live on 2 October 2016.

On 13 May 2016, Numan added a video and the following text to Facebook regarding the ballad "If I Said", wherein his daughters, Persia and Echo, sing the song in unison:

Album chart eligibility 
Following the album's release, it was revealed that, in spite of it being predominantly recorded with electronic instruments, it had been excluded from Billboard's dance/electronic music chart, with an executive from Billboard advising BMG that “Sonically, the Numan album just does not fit in" with Billboard's perception of electronic dance music. The Billboard dance/electronic chart's number one position for September 15 was held by Calvin Harris, whose album, Funk Wav Bounces Vol. 1, sold approximately 600 fewer copies than Savage.

Critical reception

Savage (Songs from a Broken World) garnered generally positive reviews. The album received an average score of 74/100 from 11 reviews on Metacritic, indicating "generally favourable reviews". AllMusic's James Christopher Monger said that Numan "can still juggle melodrama and musicality with such effortlessness is impressive, to say the least, but that he can make it so compelling is what sets him apart from his old guard new wave contemporaries." David Simpson of The Guardian had a mixed impression, saying that despite Numan sounding tired and like a faded star, his music still has a beating heart. The Quietus''' Josh Gray criticised Savage (Songs from a Broken World)'s cover art and presentation as culturally and aesthetically offensive and in "poor taste," but he praised the album's songs and themes. Chris Ingalls of PopMatters called the album "a compelling cautionary tale of what may happen if we’re too complacent to give a damn about future generations. It’s also a stunningly sharp and diverse collection of songs from a living legend."Savage'' entered the UK album chart at number two, on 22 September 2017, but it dropped out of the top twenty the following week. A re-entry to the chart in March 2018 gave the album a total chart run of 5 weeks in the Top 100.

Release formats 
Per Numan's website.
Standard CD
Deluxe hardback book CD featuring the bonus track "If I Said"
Double LP featuring two bonus tracks "If I Said" and "Cold"
Exclusive vinyl picture disc (includes signed 12×12 artwork print), limited to only 500 copies and features two bonus tracks "If I Said" and "Cold"
Cassette featuring the same tracks as the standard CD.

Track listing

Personnel
 Gary Numan – vocals, keyboards
 Ade Fenton – keyboards, programming, mixing, production
 Steve Harris – guitars
 Tim Slade – bass
 Persia Numan – backing vocals
 Nathan Boddy – mixing
 Paul Carr – mixing assistant
 Matt Colton – mastering

Charts

References 

2017 albums
Concept albums
Dark wave albums
Gary Numan albums